Yertis Pavlodar Hockey Club, commonly referred to as Irtysh Pavlodar, is a professional ice hockey team based in Pavlodar, Kazakhstan. They were founded in 2009, and play in the Pro Hokei Ligasy,  top level of ice hockey in Kazakhstan.

Season-by-season record
Note: GP = Games played, W = Wins, L = Losses, OTW = Overtime/shootout wins, OTL = Overtime/shootout losses, Pts = Points, GF = Goals for, GA = Goals against

Current roster
Updated 22 November 2013.

|}

Notable players
 	
Andrej Nedorost (born 1980), Slovak ice hockey player
Marek Pinc (born 1979), Czech ice hockey player
Eliezer Sherbatov (born 1991), Canadian-Israeli ice hockey player

Head coaches
 Oleg Bolyakin 2007–08
 Yerlan Sagymbayev 2009–11
 Julius Penzes 2011–present

Achievements 
Kazakhstan Hockey Championship:
 Winners (3): 2012-13, 2013–14, 2014–15
 Runners-up (1): 2011–12
 3rd place (1): 2009–10

Kazakhstan Hockey Cup:
 Winners (1): 2014
 Runners-up (1): 2013
 3rd place (1): 2012

References

External links
Official website

Ice hockey teams in Kazakhstan